The 2019 Klasika Primavera was the 65th edition of the Klasika Primavera, a one-day road cycling race, held on 14 April 2019. It was part of the 2019 UCI Europe Tour as a category 1.1 event.

Teams
Nine teams started the race. Each team had a maximum of eight riders:

Result

References

Klasika Primavera
2019 UCI Europe Tour
2019 in Spanish road cycling